is a district located in Iwate Prefecture, Japan.

After the third city of Ichinoseki creation on September 20, 2005, the district has only one town left.
Hiraizumi

Post-WWII timeline
January 1, 1948 - The village of Yamame gained town status.
April 1, 1948 - The town of Ichinoseki, Yamame, Nakasato, and Madaki merged to form the city of Ichinoseki (1st generation).
October 1, 1953 - The village of Hiraizumi gained town status.
January 1, 1955
The villages of Yasaka, Hagisho, and Ganmi merged with the village of Maikawa from Higashiiwai District and the city of Ichinoseki (1st generation) to form the city of Ichinoseki (2nd generation).
The village of Hanaizumi, Nagai, Dotsu, Aburajima, Oimatsu, and Higata merged to form the town of Hanaizumi.
April 15, 1955 - The town of Hiraizumi merged with the village of Nagashima from Higashiiwai District to form the town of Hiraizumi.
September 1, 1956 - The city of Ichinoseki (2nd generation) absorbed parts of the town of Hiraizumi.
September 30, 1956 - The village of Kanazawa was merged into the town of Hanaizumi.
May 1, 1964 - The city of Ichinoseki (2nd generation) absorbed parts of the town of Hiraizumi for the second time. 
September 20, 2005 - The town of Hanaizumi merged with the towns of Daitō, Higashiyama and Senmaya, and the villages of Kawasaki and Murone, all from Higashiiwai District, and the old city of Ichinoseki (2nd generation) to create the new city of Ichinoseki (3rd generation).

Districts in Iwate Prefecture